For-Profit Online University is a television special written and directed by Sam West for Adult Swim. The special is presented as an infomercial parodying for-profit universities. The special is created by Wild, Aggressive Dog, a conglomerate of former Onion writers, consisting of Geoff Haggerty, Dan E. Klein, Matthew Klinman, Michael Pielocik, Chris Sartinsky and Sam West.

The special aired on December 17, 2013 at 4 a.m. on Cartoon Network's late-night programming block, Adult Swim. The special was viewed by 871,000 viewers and received a 0.6 rating in the 18–49 demographic Nielsen household rating.

Synopsis
The infomercial consists of various students giving testimonies of their success, owing it to the school, literally named For-Profit Online University. Students pay for knowledge instead of attending traditional classes, and are offered jobs as 'Digital Gardeners,' solving CAPTCHA for digital currency. The later half of the special introduces the threat of an evil rogue spambot named Howard, who was bribed with a large sum of ThoughtCoins, a digital currency used through the school, in an attempt to placate him.

Cast
 Nicole Byer as "22MuchBIZ"
 Nelson Cheng as "LetsFunHans"
 Nick Corirossi as "FPOU_DEAN"
 Geoff Haggerty as "USAdude1981"
 Brian Huskey as "FPOU_PROF_300954"
 Ingrid Tejada as "sALTedAngel69"
 HOWARD as "HOWARD"

Production
The special presents itself as a spoof of for-profit universities infomercials, a source of frequent criticism and congressional investigation in the United States. The special is written and directed by Sam West, and is co-written by the creative writing team Wild Aggressive Dog, a conglomerate of former Onion writers, consisting of Geoff Haggerty, Dan Klein, Matthew Klinman, Michael Pielocik, Chris Sartinsky and Sam West.

Reception

For-Profit Online University aired on December 17, 2013, at 4 a.m. on Cartoon Network's late-night programming block, Adult Swim. The special was published onto Adult Swim's YouTube channel the same day. Initially made private on their channel, the special became popular online after being spotted by comedy blogs. The special was viewed by 871,000 viewers and received a 0.6 rating in the 18–49 demographic Nielsen household rating.

Dan Simmons of the Wisconsin State Journal praised the special as "hilariously" parodying "what some in academia fear is a growing movement toward commodifying college." Andy Thomason of The Chronicle of Higher Education called the presentation of the special "brutal" in its criticism of both for-profit and traditional universities. Gabe Dunn of The Daily Dot compared the fictional college to the University of Phoenix in their review of the special. Laughing Squid's EDW Lynch called the infomercial "hilarious", while Splitsider stated of all of Adult Swim's faux-infomercials, the special was "the best one yet".

See also
 Live Forever as You Are Now with Alan Resnick
 Paid Programming
 You're Whole
 Too Many Cooks

References

External links
 
 
 Digital Gardening referenced in the video

2010s American television specials
2013 television specials
Infomercial parodies
Adult Swim pilots and specials
Fictional universities and colleges